Fart most often refers to:
Flatulence, the act of expelling intestinal gas through the anus
Fart (word), a colloquial term for flatulence

Fart or FART may also refer to:

Entertainment 
"Flatulent Airborne Reaction Team", a comedy bit from Complaints and Grievances, a George Carlin album
Fathers Against Rude Television (F.A.R.T.), from "Bender Should Not Be Allowed on TV", an episode  of the Futurama sitcom

Science
 Fuzzy adaptive resonance theory, of cognition
False alarm rate testing, in statistics, Type I and type II error testing

Sports clubs 
 FL Fart (Norwegian: "Speed"), Norwegian football club
Fart Kielce (now Effector Kielce), a Polish volleyball club

Other uses
Fatal accident reconstruction team, who conduct traffic collision reconstruction
Regional Bus and Rail Company of Ticino, Switzerland

See also
Vart, vaginal flatulence